The Jewish Autonomous Oblast  is situated in the Far Eastern Federal District of Russia.

Its flag consists of a rainbow on a white background, with seven narrow horizontal colored stripes: red, orange, yellow, green, sky blue, blue and purple. The colors are slightly different from the basic spectral colors, with gold in place of yellow, vivid blue instead of light blue, and indigo as dark blue, The number of colors is meant to symbolize the seven-branched Jewish Menorah. The flag's aspect ratio is 2:3.

The rainbow flag design was adopted in 27 October 1996.

Symbolism
The white color of the cloth represents purity. Rainbows are the biblical symbol of peace, happiness, goodness. The number of bands of the rainbow equal to the number of candles in the Menorah, one of the national religious Jewish symbols. The Menorah speaks of the creation of the world in seven days, and the number of bands of the rainbow emphasizes the connection with the ancient Jewish symbol. Also, the rainbow may symbolize the Seven Noahide laws.

Rainbow flag controversy 

In 2013, the flag was checked according to the Russian gay propaganda law for the presence of "gay propaganda", because of its resemblance to the LGBT flag. The JAO flag was confirmed as safe because of its white background, white borders between the colored stripes, and the seventh (light blue) colour. However, there are gay-pride flags that use the seven colors of the JAO flag.

See also
Coat of arms of the Jewish Autonomous Oblast (Birobidzhan)
Rainbow flag

Notes and references

External links
http://www.eao.ru/eng/  – Official State site
Jewish Autonomous State Symbols 
Flags of the World – Description

Flag
Rainbow flags
Flags of the federal subjects of Russia
Flags introduced in 1996
Jew